Still Eastsidin' is Goldie Loc's debut album.

Track listing

Loc'd Out World 
Dick Hard
Killa Holiday  (featuring Seven & Boo-Ru) 
Everything  (featuring Tray Deee) 
The Craziest  (featuring Snoop Dogg) 
Pimp  (featuring Tha Eastsidaz) 
Back Up Hoe  (featuring Snoop Dogg) 
Make You Wanna  (featuring Kokane, Warren G & Johnny Chronic) 
G'd Up  (featuring Tha Eastsidaz) 
Real In The Field  (featuring Tray Deee & Warren G) 
Ride Wit' Us  (featuring Tray Deee & F.T.) 
Gangsta Groove  (featuring Kokane) 
Nite Locs  (featuring Kokane & Snoop Dogg) 
Pop Lockin'  (featuring Silkk The Shocker & Snoop Dogg) 
Can't Help It  (featuring Short Khop, Tray Deee & Kokane) 
Run On Up  (featuring Tha Eastsidaz) 
D.P.G.C.: You Know What I'm Throwin' Up (featuring Daz Dillinger & Snoop Dogg) 
They Ain't Finna Take My Shit  (featuring Pomona City Rydaz, Tray Deee & Suga Free) 
Bring It Back  (featuring Kurupt & Snoop Dogg) 

2004 albums
Goldie Loc albums